Cloverdale Municipal Airport  is a public airport located three miles (4.8 km) southeast of Cloverdale, serving Sonoma County, California, United States. It is mostly used for general aviation. Other activities at the airport include skydiving, ultralight and experimental activities. It is home to Quality Sport Planes, the western representative for Zenith Aircraft Company since 2005.

Facilities 

 Runway 14/32: 3,155 x 60 ft (962 x 18 m), surface: asphalt

References

External links 

Quality Sport Planes, LLC
 NorCal Skydiving

Airports in Sonoma County, California